Paul Gareth Brown (13 May 1960 - 13 November 2017) was a British costume and production designer. He was nominated for an Academy Award in the category Best Costume Design for the film Angels & Insects. Brown died in November 2017.

Selected filmography 
 Angels & Insects (1996)

References

External links 

1960 births
2017 deaths
British costume designers
British production designers